is a city located in Kanagawa Prefecture, Japan.

As of June 2012, the city has an estimated population of 58,087, and a population density of 3,350 per km².

Geography
Zushi is located at the head of Miura Peninsula, facing Sagami Bay on the Pacific Ocean.

Surrounding municipalities
Kamakura
Yokosuka
Kanazawa-ku, Yokohama
Hayama

History
The area of Zushi has been inhabited since prehistoric times, and numerous Kofun period and Yayoi period remains have been discovered. During the Heian period, it came under the control of the Miura clan, and during the Kamakura period formed part of the outer fortifications for Kamakura. The port of Kotsubo is mentioned frequently in the Azuma Kagami. The name 'Zushi' has been written in many different ways, including . The term "zushi" itself means a street, an alley or an intersection and came to the Kantō region from Kyoto. During the Edo period, along with most of eastern Sagami Province, the area was tenryō territory under direct control of the Tokugawa shogunate, and administered by various hatamoto.

In the April 1, 1889, cadastral reform after the Meiji Restoration, Tagoe Village within Miura District Kanagawa Prefecture was created through the merger of six local hamlets. Development of the area was encouraged by the opening of the Yokosuka Line railway on June 16, 1889. Tagoe Village changed its name to Zushi Village on April 1, 1924; however, on April 1, 1943 it was annexed by Yokusuka city. Zushi regained its status as an independent municipality on July 1, 1950, as Zushi Town. City status was gained on April 15, 1954. Zushi developed as a resort area in the 1960s, with the opening of Zushi Marina in 1967. In the mid-1990s, the city was the center of a political controversy involving the creation of a housing area for the United States Navy at Ikego, the site of a former Imperial Japanese Navy ammunition depot, to support the expansion of nearby Yokosuka Naval Base. When the citizens of Zushi first learned of these plans in the 1980s, they organized a movement to save the Ikego Forest. Led by the women of the town, the movement sought preservation of Ikego as a park and wildlife sanctuary. A decade of opposition by the citizens of Zushi had been effective in slowing the development. The construction was definitely forced through in 1994, when the Zushi Municipal Government finally accepted 854 housing units after winning a promise from the central government to Zushi and Kanagawa Prefecture that it would not build any more facilities in the Ikego area. However, a plan contravening this agreement was introduced in July 2003. To prevent the building of 800 additional U.S. military housing units a citizen's group called the Association to Stop the US Residential Construction and to Protect Ikego Forest launched an opposition movement in 2004.

Government and politics 
 2006 Zushi mayoral election

Economy
Zushi is a popular beach resort, and has attracted many famous writers (e.g. Roka Tokutomi), media personalities (e.g. Yujiro Ishihara and Mino Monta), musicians and politicians (e.g. Shintaro Ishihara) as either a residence or location for a second home. The city is largely a bedroom community for Tokyo and Yokohama. It is the home of Shonan Beach FM radio station (FM and internet radio).

Transportation

Rail
JR East – Yokosuka Line
 ・ 
Keikyū Zushi Line
 ・

Highways
National Route 134

Local attractions

 Ganden-ji, number two of the Bandō Sanjūsankasho
 Hosshō-ji, Nichiren-sect temple that is supposed to lie on the spot where Nichiren was rescued from a mob by three white monkeys.

International relations

Twin towns — Sister cities
Zushi is twinned with:
  Ikaho, Gunma, Japan (1979)
  Nazaré, Portugal (2004)

Notable people

Takeshi Aikoh – professional baseball player
Nobuteru Ishihara – politician
Hirotaka Ishihara – politician
Risako Sugaya – singer
Kaori Yoneyama – professional wrestler
Tamio Kawachi – actor
Rita Taketsuru – wife of Masataka Taketsuru, founder of Nikka Whisky
Mutsuo Takahashi – writer

References

External links 

Official Website 

 
Cities in Kanagawa Prefecture
Populated coastal places in Japan
Populated places established in 1950
1950 establishments in Japan